Pontefract North is an electoral ward of the City of Wakefield district, used for elections to Wakefield Metropolitan District Council.

Overview 
The ward is one of 21 in the Wakefield district, and has been held by Labour since the current boundaries were formed for the 2004 Council election. As of 2015, the electorate stands at 12,495 of which 94.4% identify as "White British" and 69.3% of who identify as Christian.

Notable landmarks in the ward include Pontefract Racecourse, Pontefract Castle and Valeo Confectionery, with the main areas being Monkhill and Pontefract Town centre.

Representation 
Like all wards in the Wakefield district, Pontefract North has 3 councillors, whom are elected on a 4-year-rota. This means elections for new councillors are held for three years running, with one year every four years having no elections.

The current councillors are Clive Tennant, Patricia Garbutt and Lorna Malkin, all of whom are Labour.

The last time a Conservative councillor represented the ward was Philip Thomas who elected in the 2008 Council election however, he ran for re-election as an independent as was subsequently defeated in the 2011 election by Paula Sherriff who would later serve as the Member of Parliament (MP) for Dewsbury between 2015 and 2019.

Councillors

Election Results 

*The by-election follows the resignation of Paula Sheriff who was elected the MP for Dewsbury.

*The 2004 election was the first one with the new boundaries. As such, all three seats were up for election.

References 

Pontefract
City of Wakefield
Politics of Wakefield
Wards of Wakefield